The 2019 KBO League season was the 38th season in the history of the KBO League. The regular season began on March 23 and ended on October 1. The All-Star break was extended from four days to seven.

Standings

Doosan Bears ranked ahead of SK Wyverns due to winning their head-to-head season series 9-7.

League Leaders

Foreign players
Each team could sign up to three foreign players, one of whom must be a hitter. In 2019, the KBO League capped salaries for new foreign players at US$1 million.

Foreign hitters

Postseason

Wild Card
The series started with a 1–0 advantage for the fourth-placed team.

Semi-playoff

Playoff

Korean Series

Attendances

See also
2019 Major League Baseball season
2019 Nippon Professional Baseball season

References

KBO League seasons
KBO League season
KBO League season